Eastville, a village in the East Lindsey district of Lincolnshire, England.

History 
Eastville was an extra-parochial allotment of the East Fen, which was drained between 1802 and 1813, and constituted as a township by act of parliament passed in 1812. It was organized as a civil parish in 1866.

The Anglican parish church in Eastville was dedicated to Saint Paul and built at the same time as the parsonage, house and school. It was authorized under the Fens Churches Act of 1816. The Victorian Gothic church was consecrated in 1840 by John C. Carter, and was probably built shortly beforehand. It is a Grade II listed building. The church has been closed since 2007 because of structural problems and ground shrinkage making it unstable; officials have applied to demolish it because there are no funds for restoration. In October 2013, the judge of the Consistory Court urged the diocese to study alternatives for saving the church, as he did not agree that it should be demolished.

The first Eastville school was condemned by an HM Inspector of Schools. A new school was built on the same site by the Eastville School Board (formed in 1895), and opened in 1897 as the Eastville Board School. By 1981, when it finally closed, it was known as the Eastville County Primary School. Tha last Head Teacher was Mrs M B Hands who retired when the school closed. The last school secretary was Mrs Dawber.

Rail connections

Economy 
There is a composting plant here, producing bagged garden compost.

References

Works cited

External links

Villages in Lincolnshire
East Lindsey District
Civil parishes in Lincolnshire